Giovanni dei Tagliacozzi (died 1540) was a Roman Catholic prelate who served as Bishop of Chioggia (1535–1540).

Biography
On 20 October 1535, he was appointed during the papacy of Pope Paul III as Bishop of Chioggia.
On 7 December 1535, he was consecrated bishop by Defendente Valvassori, Bishop of Capodistria, with Giacomo de Cadapesario, Bishop of Paphos, and Vincenzo Negusanti, Bishop of Arbe, serving as co-consecrators. 
He served as Bishop of Chioggia until his death on 5 October 1540.

References

External links and additional sources
 (for Chronology of Bishops) 
 (for Chronology of Bishops) 

16th-century Italian Roman Catholic bishops
Bishops appointed by Pope Paul III
1540 deaths